Louisiana Highway 77 (LA 77) is a state highway in Louisiana that serves Iberville and Pointe Coupee parishes. It spans .

Route description
LA 77 begins at LA 1 near The Island Country Club in Plaquemine and runs parallel with Bayou Jacob as it heads west. Leaving Plaquemine, the highway then runs parallel with LA 3066 and Bayou Plaquemine heading through Crescent. Meeting Port Allen Lock, it crosses over the Bayou Grosse Tête Draw Bridge before heading north. It then runs parallel with Port Allen Lock and then heads northwest, intersecting with LA 386 before heading into Grosse Tête. The highway then interchanges with I-10 at exit 139 before entering Rosedale and intersecting LA 76. LA 77 then runs parallel with LA 411 heading into Maringouin. It then intersects LA 977 and runs through downtown before meeting LA 76 again before heading north. The highway then enters Valverda and intersects LA 977 before running parallel with LA 411 and Port Allen Lock. It then intersects LA 81 and US 190 before passing through Livonia. The highway then turns to the west and passes through Fordoche and intersects LA 81 again before turning to the north. LA 77 then meets its northern terminus at LA 10 and the road continues north assigned as LA 10.

Junction list

Spur route

Louisiana Spur Highway 77 (Spur LA 77) is a  highway that covers a glitch in the state highway system. The current LA 77 follows the routing of the original Jefferson Highway, and the LA 77 alignment follows the old road to meet LA 10 West. However, this shortcut is used to reach Morganza, to the northeast of Livonia.

Junction list

References

External links

LADOTD map of Numbered Highways in Louisiana

0077
Transportation in Iberville Parish, Louisiana
Transportation in Pointe Coupee Parish, Louisiana